Inger Agneta Segelström (born 25 February 1952 in Stockholm) is a Swedish politician and former Member of the European Parliament. She is a member of the Swedish Social Democratic Party, part of the Socialist Group.

She sat on the European Parliament's Committee on Civil Liberties, Justice and Home Affairs. She is also a substitute for the Committee on Foreign Affairs and the Delegation to the EU-Russia Parliamentary Cooperation Committee.

Education
 1979: Law degree, Stockholm University

Career
 1977-1978: Employed by AFS International Education
 1979-1984: Research assistant, principal executive officer, Labour Market Board
 1984-1987: Commissioner's assistant secretary, finance department Stockholm City Hall
 1987-1990: Head of administration, Stockholm University students' union
 1990-1994: Environment secretary, association of local authorities, Stockholm County
 1995-2003: Chairwoman of the Swedish Social Democratic Women's Federation
 since 2003: Chairwoman of the Council on Media Violence
 1988: Substitute member of Stockholm County Council
 1989-1991: Member of the staff committee, Stockholm County Council
 1992-1994: Member of the Stockholm County Administrative Board
 1994-2004: Member of the Swedish Parliament
 1980-1984: Chairwoman of the foundation/association Alla Kvinnors Hus (All Women's House)

See also
 2004 European Parliament election in Sweden

Sources
 
 
  

1952 births
Living people
Stockholm University alumni
Swedish Social Democratic Party MEPs
MEPs for Sweden 2004–2009
21st-century women MEPs for Sweden
Women members of the Riksdag
Members of the Riksdag 2002–2006